Lysøen is an island in Bjørnafjorden in Vestland county, Norway. 
Lysøen is also the site of Villa Lysøen (Ole Bulls villa på Lysøen), the home of Norwegian violin-virtuoso and composer Ole Bull until his death in 1880.

Villa Lysøen
The island was originally the site of a farm established around 1670. The island was bought by Ole Bull in 1872 who constructed the villa. Ole Bull drew the plans for the villa himself, under the supervision of renowned Norwegian architect Conrad Fredrik von der Lippe (1833–1901). Ole Bull had a large villa built on the island, inspired by numerous architectural styles, including the Swiss chalet style and Moorish architecture. It has a tower formed as an onion dome, common in Russian architecture, and many wooden carvings.

Ole Bull transformed his  island property into a fairy-tale kingdom by having romantic paths, ponds and gazebos made by planting exotic trees and bushes in the native pine forest. The island has 13 km of walkways and paths. His second wife Sara Chapman Thorp (1850–1911) accompanied him to their summer villa on Lysøen.

The highest point on the island, 76 meters above sea level, is the site of a lookout tower which was built in 1903 by Ole Bull's American descendants. In 1974, Bull's granddaughter Sylvea Bull Curtis of Connecticut donated the island to the Society for the Preservation of Ancient Norwegian Monuments. Lysøen granted status as a museum in 1984 and has since been open to the public. Guided tours are conducted from early May to August.  The villa serves as a museum in the summer and is used for concerts during the annual Bergen International Festival.

Interior of Villa

See also 
 List of music museums

References

Other sources
Indahl, Trond   (2010) Ole Bull’s Villa (Bergen: Bodoni forlag)
Brekke, Nils Georg  (1993) Kulturhistorisk vegbok Hordaland (Bergen: Hordaland Fylkeskommune)   
Bull, Sara C.  (1981) Ole Bull: A Memoir (New York: Da Capo Press)

External links

Lysøen Museum
The Society for the Preservation of Norwegian Ancient Monuments
Lysøen, Ole Bull's villa in Bergen, Norway

Historic house museums in Norway
Museums in Vestland
Culture in Vestland
Os, Hordaland
Tourist attractions in Vestland
Parks in Norway
Biographical museums in Norway
Music museums
Music organisations based in Norway